Cyanopsia is a medical term for seeing everything tinted with blue. It is also referred to as blue vision. Cyanopsia often occurs for a few days, weeks, or months after removal of a cataract from the eye. Cyanopsia also sometimes occurs as a side effect of taking sildenafil, tadalafil, or vardenafil.

Cyanopsia is a medical symptom and not a sign. It is a purely subjective state and can be caused by a physical or functional abnormality of the eye, a physical or functional abnormality of the brain, or be purely psychological. Cyanopsia, if unaccompanied by any other sign or symptom, is not an indication of any disease or disorder. Unless it causes an impairment or significant distress, it is not in and of itself diagnostically relevant.

Cyanopsia after cataract removal

The eye's lens is normally tinted yellow. This reduces the intensity of blue light reaching the retina. When the lens is removed because of cataract, it is usually replaced by an artificial intraocular lens; these artificial lenses are clear, allowing more intense blue light than usual to fall on the retina, leading to the phenomenon.

Hayashi and Hayashi (2006) compared visual function in people given yellow-tinted intraocular lenses with that in people given non-tinted intraocular lenses. Those with the yellow-tinted lenses were less likely to report cyanopsia than those with the clear lenses. Hayashi and Hayashi found no differences in visual acuity or in contrast sensitivity between the two groups. They also found that no one reported cyanopsia three months after the cataract operation, suggesting that some form of neural adaptation or colour constancy had taken place.

Cyanopsia from sildenafil

The author of Viagra and vision attributes cyanopsia after taking sildenafil to diminished enzyme activity, thereby sensitizing the retinal rod cells. Rod cells are most sensitive to light of wavelengths near 498 nm; such light appears blue-green. When light levels are low enough for both rods and cone cells to be active (mesopic vision) the enhanced rod activity induces the bluish visual tint.

See also
Xanthopsia

References

External links
 https://web.archive.org/web/20070524033238/http://www.psych.ucalgary.ca/PACE/VA-LAB/Brian/acquired.htm for illustrations of various colour deficiencies including cyanopsia.

Color vision